St Mary's Church is a Grade I listed parish church in the Church of England in Lowdham.

History

The church dates from the 13th century but was restored in 1860 by Scott. The spire was repaired in 1883 and the chancel restored in 1890.

It is part of a joint parish with: 
St Aidan's Church, Caythorpe
St John the Baptist's Church, Gunthorpe

Memorials

Sir John de Lowdham 1318, reclining cross legged effigy clad in chain mail.
Charles Broughton, slate tablets
Petri Broughton, 1695, east wall

Organ
The small 2 manual 12 stop pipe organ is by Charles Lloyd, and it was rebuilt in 1963 by Cousins of Lincoln. A specification of the organ can be found on the National Pipe Organ Register.

References

Church of England church buildings in Nottinghamshire
Grade I listed churches in Nottinghamshire
Mary